Thomas Carter ( – August 1726) was an Irish politician.  He was a Member of Parliament (MP) for the borough of Fethard in County Tipperary from 1695 to 1703, and for Portarlington from 1703 to 1713.

References 

1650 births
1726 deaths
Members of the Parliament of Ireland (pre-1801) for County Tipperary constituencies
Members of the Parliament of Ireland (pre-1801) for Portarlington
Irish MPs 1695–1699
Irish MPs 1703–1713